Nelson Giovany Quiñónes Iturre (born 20 August 2002) is a Colombian professional footballer who plays as a winger for Major League Soccer club Houston Dynamo on loan from Once Caldas.

Career

Once Caldas 
Quiñónes came through the youth ranks of Once Caldas.  On 24 July 2021, he made his first-team debut as an 18-year-old, coming off the bench in a 1–1 draw against Jaguares de Córdoba.  Quiñónes scored his first goal for Once Caldas on 6 November, also picking up an assist in the match to give El Blanco a 2–1 win over Envigado.  He finished the season with 11 appearances, 1 goal, and 1 assist as Once Caldas finished 17th in the Torneo Finalización table.

During the 2022 Torneo Apertura, Quiñónes made 15 appearances as Once Caldas finished 12th in the first stage standings.  He also made 2 appearances in the Copa Colombia and 3 in the 2022 Torneo Finalización prior to going out on loan.

Houston Dynamo 
On 27 July 2022, Quiñónes signed with Major League Soccer side Houston Dynamo on a year long loan with an option to make the deal permanent.  He made his Dynamo debut on 27 August, coming on as a sub in a 2–1 loss to Minnesota United.  Quiñónes ended the season with 8 appearances for the Dynamo, coming off the bench in each of Houston's final 8 games.  The Dynamo finished 13th in the Western Conference, failing to qualify for the playoffs.

Career statistics

Club

References

External links

2002 births
Living people
People from Tumaco
Colombian footballers
Association football forwards
Colombian expatriate footballers
Expatriate soccer players in the United States
Colombian expatriate sportspeople in the United States
Categoría Primera A players
Once Caldas footballers
Houston Dynamo FC players